The 2008 SunTrust Indy Challenge was the ninth round of the 2008 IndyCar Series season and took place on June 28, 2008 at the  Richmond International Raceway, in Henrico County, Virginia. At the start, Ryan Hunter-Reay spun just before the start/finish line, which brought the yellow out immediately. The first 7 laps were run under yellow with Tony Kanaan leading from the pole position. On lap 8, the green came out, but only one lap was completed before the next yellow. Will Power was driving below Hélio Castroneves, lost control, and crashed in turn 4. The race finally got going on lap 21, when the green came out once again. On lap 31, A. J. Foyt IV touched wheels with John Andretti, and Foyt crashed in the wall in turn 2. His Vision Racing teammate Ed Carpenter ran over debris from the crash, and both cars were sidelined. During the caution, a handful of cars pitted, including Danica Patrick and rookie Jaime Camara, but most of the leaders stayed on the track.

Kanaan continued to lead when debris brought out the caution again on lap 67. All of the leaders pitted, while Camara and Patrick stayed out and took the first two spots. On the restart, Camara led the field, but Buddy Rice spun and tagged the wall on the frontstretch. The field checked up, and Darren Manning, Ryan Briscoe and Bruno Junqueira were involved in a separate crash. Camara led at the next restart, while Kanaan, Patrick, and Castroneves went 3-wide for second. Behind them in turn 2, John Andretti and Vítor Meira tangled, and crashed hard in the wall. Patrick returned to the pits, and topped off with fuel. Camara continued to lead, and impressively held off Kanaan on the restart. On lap 116, Marco Andretti caught up to Camara, and took the lead for the first time.

Graham Rahal crashed on lap 133 in turn 4. Many of the leaders pitted, but Marco Andretti stayed out to lead. Another restart saw only three green laps, as yet another crash occurred, this time involving Hunter-Reay and Mario Moraes. Around this time, some teams anticipated that rain might end the race early. Marco Andretti gave up the lead on lap 204 when he made his final pit stop. That put Kanaan back into the lead. On lap 217, after a brilliant run in the top five, Camara lost control and crashed on the frontstretch. The yellow trapped Andretti a lap down, and kept Kanaan in the lead after the final sequence of pits stops. The rain held off, and Kanaan led the rest of the way for his first victory of the season.

Result

References
IndyCar Series (Archived 2009-06-01)

SunTrust Indy Challenge
SunTrust Indy Challenge
SunTrust Indy Challenge
SunTrust Indy Challenge